"Get Myself Into It" is a song by American rock band The Rapture. It was released as the lead single from their second studio album, Pieces of the People We Love, on September 4, 2006. It peaked at number 36 on the UK Singles Chart.

Track listing

7" vinyls
 Vertigo — 170 5166-9

 Vertigo — 170 5168-3

12" vinyl
 Schnauzer / Throne of Blood — 01 WOOF

CD
 Vertigo – 0-06025-1705165-2

Charts

Release history

References

2006 singles
2006 songs
The Rapture (band) songs